Kristopher "Chip" Ritter is an author, drummer, musician, and entertainer. Perhaps, best known for his appearance and showmanship on The Late Show with David Letterman in 2004 where he juggled three drumsticks while playing the drums during his "Stupid Human Tricks" spotlight. Career highlights include becoming an author for Mel Bay Publications as well as being recognized on Drummerworld.com 

As an active artist, Ritter has performed at drumming events including the 2007 Tiger Bill Drumbeat Festival in New Jersey, the 2008 Chicago Drum Show, the 2009 Hollywood Drum Show, and the 2010 Drummers for Jesus Festival in Dallas, Texas. Ritter has shared clinic rosters and stages with fellow artists including Aaron Spears, Calvin Rodgers, Gerald Heyward, Gorden Campbell, Marvin McQuitty, Nisan Stewart, Richie Gajate Garcia, Seth Davis, Teddy Campbell, and many others.

Publications

 “The Ritter Method” - 2002 
 “Stick Tricks” - 2006 
 "The Pedal of Boom” - 2009 
 "Snare Force One - 2012

References

External links
 Melbay.com - Chip Ritter
 Modern Drummer Magazine - Chip Ritter

Living people
American drummers
Year of birth missing (living people)